In particle physics, a kaon, also called a K meson and denoted , is any of a group of four mesons distinguished by a quantum number called strangeness. In the quark model they are understood to be bound states of a strange quark (or antiquark) and an up or down antiquark (or quark).

Kaons have proved to be a copious source of information on the nature of fundamental interactions since their discovery in cosmic rays in 1947. They were essential in establishing the foundations of the Standard Model of particle physics, such as the quark model of hadrons and the theory of quark mixing (the latter was acknowledged by a Nobel Prize in Physics in 2008). Kaons have played a distinguished role in our understanding of fundamental conservation laws: CP violation, a phenomenon generating the observed matter–antimatter asymmetry of the universe, was discovered in the kaon system in 1964 (which was acknowledged by a Nobel Prize in 1980). Moreover, direct CP violation was discovered in the kaon decays in the early 2000s by the NA48 experiment at CERN and the KTeV experiment at Fermilab.

Basic properties
The four kaons are :
, negatively charged (containing a strange quark and an up antiquark) has mass  and mean lifetime .
, neutrally charged (containing a down quark and a strange antiquark) has mass .
, neutrally charged (antiparticle of above) (containing a strange quark and a down antiquark) has the same mass.

As the quark model shows, assignments that the kaons form two doublets of isospin; that is, they belong to the fundamental representation of SU(2) called the 2. The antiparticles form the other doublet (of strangeness −1).

[*] See Notes on neutral kaons in the article List of mesons, and neutral kaon mixing, below.
[§]Strong eigenstate. No definite lifetime (see neutral kaon mixing).
[†]Weak eigenstate. Makeup is missing small CP–violating term (see neutral kaon mixing).

Thus, once created the two are better thought of as superpositions of two weak eigenstates which have vastly different lifetimes:

(See discussion of neutral kaon mixing below.)

An experimental observation made in 1964 that K-longs rarely decay into two pions was the discovery of CP violation (see below).

Main decay modes for :

 

Parity violation
Two different decays were found for charged strange mesons:
{| border=0
|- style="height: 2em;"
|     || → ||  + 
|- style="height: 2em;"
|  || → ||  +  + 
|}
The intrinsic parity of a pion is P = −1, and parity is a multiplicative quantum number. Therefore, the two final states have different parity (P = +1 and P = −1, respectively). It was thought that the initial states should also have different parities, and hence be two distinct particles. However, with increasingly precise measurements, no difference was found between the masses and lifetimes of each, respectively, indicating that they are the same particle. This was known as the τ–θ puzzle. It was resolved only by the discovery of parity violation in weak interactions.

History

 The discovery of hadrons with the internal quantum number "strangeness" marks the beginning of a most exciting epoch in particle physics that even now, fifty years later, has not yet found its conclusion ... by and large experiments have driven the development, and that major discoveries came unexpectedly or even against expectations expressed by theorists.  — Bigi & Sanda (2016)

While looking for the hypothetical nuclear meson, Louis Leprince-Ringuet found evidence for the existence of a positively charged heavier particle in 1944.

In 1947, G.D. Rochester and C.C. Butler of the University of Manchester published two cloud chamber photographs of cosmic ray-induced events, one showing what appeared to be a neutral particle decaying into two charged pions, and one which appeared to be a charged particle decaying into a charged pion and something neutral. The estimated mass of the new particles was very rough, about half a proton's mass. More examples of these "V-particles" were slow in coming.

In 1949, Rosemary Brown (later Rosemary Fowler), a research student in C.F. Powell's Bristol group, spotted her 'k' track, made by a particle of very similar mass that decayed to three pions. This led to the so-called 'Tau-Theta' problem: What seemed to be the same particles (now called ) decayed in two different modes, Theta to two pions (parity +1), Tau to three pions (parity −1). The solution to this puzzle turned out to be that weak interactions do not conserve parity.

The first breakthrough was obtained at Caltech, where a cloud chamber was taken up Mount Wilson, for greater cosmic ray exposure. In 1950, 30 charged and 4 neutral "V-particles" were reported. Inspired by this, numerous mountaintop observations were made over the next several years, and by 1953, the following terminology was being used: "L meson" for either a muon or charged pion; "K meson" meant a particle intermediate in mass between the pion and nucleon.

Leprince-Rinquet coined the still-used term "hyperon" to mean any particle heavier than a nucleon. The Leprince-Ringuet particle turned out to be the K meson.

The problem of this mismatch was solved by Abraham Pais who postulated the new quantum number called "strangeness" which is conserved in strong interactions but violated by the weak interactions. Strange particles appear copiously due to "associated production" of a strange and an antistrange particle together. It was soon shown that this could not be a multiplicative quantum number, because that would allow reactions which were never seen in the new synchrotrons which were commissioned in Brookhaven National Laboratory in 1953 and in the Lawrence Berkeley Laboratory in 1955.

CP violation in neutral meson oscillations
Initially it was thought that although parity was violated, CP (charge parity) symmetry was conserved. In order to understand the discovery of CP violation, it is necessary to understand the mixing of neutral kaons; this phenomenon does not require CP violation, but it is the context in which CP violation was first observed.

Neutral kaon mixing

Since neutral kaons carry strangeness, they cannot be their own antiparticles. There must be then two different neutral kaons, differing by two units of strangeness. The question was then how to establish the presence of these two mesons. The solution used a phenomenon called neutral particle oscillations, by which these two kinds of mesons can turn from one into another through the weak interactions, which cause them to decay into pions (see the adjacent figure).

These oscillations were first investigated by Murray Gell-Mann and Abraham Pais together. They considered the CP-invariant time evolution of states with opposite strangeness. In matrix notation one can write

where ψ is a quantum state of the system specified by the amplitudes of being in each of the two basis states (which are a and b at time t = 0). The diagonal elements (M) of the Hamiltonian are due to strong interaction physics which conserves strangeness. The two diagonal elements must be equal, since the particle and antiparticle have equal masses in the absence of the weak interactions. The off-diagonal elements, which mix opposite strangeness particles, are due to weak interactions; CP symmetry requires them to be real.

The consequence of the matrix H being real is that the probabilities of the two states will forever oscillate back and forth. However, if any part of the matrix were imaginary, as is forbidden by CP symmetry, then part of the combination will diminish over time. The diminishing part can be either one component (a) or the other (b), or a mixture of the two.

Mixing
The eigenstates are obtained by diagonalizing this matrix. This gives new eigenvectors, which we can call K1 which is the  difference  of the two states of opposite strangeness, and K2, which is the  sum. The two are eigenstates of CP with opposite eigenvalues; K1 has CP = +1, and K2 has CP = -1 Since the two-pion final state also has CP = +1, only the K2 can decay this way. The K2 must decay into three pions. 

Since the mass of K2 is just a little larger than the sum of the masses of three pions, this decay proceeds very slowly, about 600 times slower than the decay of K1 into two pions. These two different modes of decay were observed by Leon Lederman and his coworkers in 1956, establishing the existence of the two weak eigenstates (states with definite lifetimes under decays via the weak force) of the neutral kaons.

CP symmetry, which was assumed at the time, implies that  = K1 and  = K2.

Oscillation

An initially pure beam of  will turn into its antiparticle, while propagating, which will turn back into the original particle, and so on. This is called particle oscillation. On observing the weak decay into leptons, it was found that a  always decayed into a positron, whereas the antiparticle  decayed into the electron. The earlier analysis yielded a relation between the rate of electron and positron production from sources of pure  and its antiparticle . Since this is due to weak interactions it is very small, 10−15 times the mass of each state, namely

Regeneration
A beam of neutral kaons decays in flight so that the short-lived  disappears, leaving a beam of pure long-lived . The  undergoes quasi-elastic scattering with nucleons, whereas its antiparticle can create hyperons. Due to the different interactions of the two components, quantum coherence between the two particles is lost. Regeneration was observed by Oreste Piccioni and his collaborators at Lawrence Berkeley National Laboratory. Soon thereafter, Robert Adair and his coworkers reported excess  regeneration, thus opening a new chapter in this history.

CP violation
While trying to verify Adair's results, J. Christenson, James Cronin, Val Fitch and Rene Turlay of Princeton University found decays of  into two pions (CP = +1)
in an experiment performed in 1964 at the Alternating Gradient Synchrotron at the Brookhaven laboratory. As explained in an earlier section, this required the assumed initial and final states to have different values of CP, and hence immediately suggested CP violation. Alternative explanations such as nonlinear quantum mechanics and a new unobserved particle (hyperphoton) were soon ruled out, leaving CP violation as the only possibility. Cronin and Fitch received the Nobel Prize in Physics for this discovery in 1980.

Instead, for small ε (and up to normalization),

 = K2 + εK1

Thus occasionally the  decays as a K1 with CP = +1, and likewise the  can decay with CP = −1. There is also a direct CP violation effect, in which the CP violation occurs during the decay itself. Both are present, because both mixing and decay arise from the same interaction with the W boson and thus have CP violation predicted by the CKM matrix. Direct CP violation was discovered in the kaon decays in the early 2000s by the NA48 and KTeV experiments at CERN and Fermilab.

See also
Hadrons, mesons, hyperons and flavour
Strange quark and the quark model
Parity (physics), charge conjugation, time reversal symmetry, CPT invariance and CP violation
Neutrino oscillation
Neutral particle oscillation

Footnotes

References

Bibliography
 
 
 The quark model, by J.J.J. Kokkedee

External links

Mesons
Strange quark
Asymmetry